Jeera Jarernsuk (born May 18, 1985), simply known as Art, is a Thai professional footballer who plays as a full-back.

Club career

He played for Bangkok University in the 2007 AFC Champions League group stage.

Honours

Club
Bangkok University
 Thai Premier League: 2006
Chainat Hornbill
 Thai League 2: 2017

International
Thailand U-23
 Sea Games Gold Medal: 2007

External links
 Profile at Goal
https://us.soccerway.com/players/jeera--jarernsuk/188983/

1985 births
Living people
Jeera Jarernsuk
Jeera Jarernsuk
Association football fullbacks
Jeera Jarernsuk
Jeera Jarernsuk
Jeera Jarernsuk
Jeera Jarernsuk
Jeera Jarernsuk
Jeera Jarernsuk
Southeast Asian Games medalists in football
Jeera Jarernsuk
Competitors at the 2007 Southeast Asian Games